The Blériot XXIII was a racing monoplane produced in 1911 by Blériot Aéronautique. Two were built, both of which were flown in the 1911 Gordon Bennett Trophy competition at Eastchurch; one, flown by Alfred Leblanc, achieving second place.

Design and development
The Blériot XXIII was a shoulder-wing monoplane with a fully covered square-section fuselage with a down-curved appearance and extremely narrow chord wings.

After it was apparent that the aircraft was some five seconds a lap slower than the Nieuport II being flown by Charles Weymann, Blériot altered both machines by shortening the wings, reducing the span to around 5.2 m (17 ft). The result was described by C. G. Grey, editor of The Aeroplane, as looking "more like the latter half of a dogfish with a couple of visiting cards stuck on it than anything else".

Gustav Hamel was the first competitor to start, but after misjudging a turn on the first lap he crashed spectacularly, throwing him out of the aircraft. Miraculously, he only sustained minor injuries. The second aircraft, flown by Alfred Leblanc finished second, his time of 73 minutes 40.2 seconds putting him just over two minutes behind Charles Weymann, who won the event.

Specifications

References

Bibliography

Opdycke, Leonard E. French Aeroplanes Before the Great War. Atglen, PA: Schiffer, 1999. 
Villard, Henry Serrano Blue Ribbon of the Air. Washington: Smithsonian Press, 1987. .

23
Single-engined tractor aircraft
1910s French sport aircraft
Racing aircraft
Shoulder-wing aircraft
Aircraft first flown in 1911
Rotary-engined aircraft